Jandar may refer to:

 Jandar, Iran, a village in West Azerbaijan Province
 Jandar, Syria, a village south of Homs
 Jandar (Heroscape), a fictional general in the game HeroScape
 Yaman Jandar (fl. 1292), founder of Candarid beylik (principality) in Anatolia

See also
 Jandar Gol-e Sofla, a village in Bamyan Province, Afghanistan
 Jandar Gol-e ʽOlya, a village in Bamyan Province, Afghanistan
 Wanda Jandar,  a village in Dera Ismail Khan, Khyber Pakhtunkhwa, Pakistan
 Jandar of Callisto, 1972 science fantasy novel by Lin Carter
 Jantar (disambiguation)
 Yantar (disambiguation)